Looking Forward is a 1999 album by Crosby, Stills, Nash & Young.

Looking Forward may also refer to:
 Looking Forward (1910 film), an American silent short drama
 Looking Forward (1933 film), an American pre-Code drama film
 Looking Forward (anthology), an anthology of science fiction stories edited by Milton Lesser
a poem from A Child's Garden of Verses by Robert Louis Stevenson